The Late Shows are a one weekend annual cultural initiative developed in Tyne & Wear since 2007. They are intended to attract new audiences to museums and galleries. They have become the largest programme organised in the United Kingdom for the 'Museums at Night Festival'.

History

The programme started as a one-night event with 14 cultural venues taking part including Discovery Museum, Baltic Centre for Contemporary Art and the Laing Art Gallery. All the venues stayed open late and put on free events and exhibitions, which aimed to entice a new, younger audience through their doors. From the outset many different agencies came together to open their doors and this has continued. In mid-May 2013, more than 50 attractions feature  in what an arts site for the region describes as "The North East’s legendary culture crawl, The Late Shows". An Arts Council of England case study demonstrates its impact. That report gives headline information thus "In 2009, 54 events held over two nights across the 29 venues taking part attracted 15,116 visitors. This involved nine commissions, 126 artists and four education sessions. The total audience, including print, broadcast and online was 701,800. The Late Shows 2010 has built on that success with over 19,500 people heading to NewcastleGateshead's museums and galleries after-hours. We supported The Late Shows with £25,000 of National Lottery funding from our Grants for the arts scheme. Support from other partner organisations included £39.974 from Culture 10, £8,703 from North East Regional Museums Hub and £17,990 of support in kind from the participating venues". In 2013 The Late Shows were a bronze award winner at the North East England Tourism awards.

Selected notable venues

Laing Art Gallery
The Biscuit Factory
Baltic Centre for Contemporary Art
Victoria Tunnel (Newcastle)
The Sage Gateshead
Moorbank Botanic Gardens (now closed)
Hatton Gallery
Tyne and Wear Archives Service
North of England Institute of Mining and Mechanical Engineers
Literary and Philosophical Society of Newcastle upon Tyne
Bessie Surtees House

Selected notable artists

Julia Vogl
Jenny Holzer

References

External links
Bill Griffiths entry on London Museum's blog. Evaluation Case Study.
Bill Griffith's explains the ethos and functionality of The Late Shows in the Culture 24 Museums at Night site.
The Late Shows main page.

Festivals in Tyne and Wear
Nightlife
Arts festivals in England
Culture in Newcastle upon Tyne
Gateshead
Tourist attractions in Newcastle upon Tyne